Euxoa satiens is a species of moth of the family Noctuidae. It is found from British Columbia, south to California.

The wingspan is about 34 mm.

External links
Images

Euxoa
Moths of North America
Moths described in 1890